The Rivers class was a class of eleven ocean liners of the Norddeutscher Lloyd (NDL), the first class of German express liners. The ships were built between 1881 and 1890, the first nine in Glasgow by John Elder & Co. or the renamed Fairfield Shipbuilding and Engineering Company, the last two in Stettin by Vulcan. All were named for rivers in Germany.

Background
The new ship was larger than other Atlantic liners and with a speed of 16 knots, she cut the travel time between Southampton and New York City from ten and a half to eight and a half days. Johann Georg Lohmann, who had at the time been director of Norddeutscher Lloyd for one year, in 1880 contracted with the Arizonas builder, John Elder & Co. of Glasgow, to build NDL's own first express liner, in accordance with the company's stated objective of always having the best ships.

History
The Fulda was the first NDL ship with electric lighting. The Werra set an eastbound speed record of 7 days, 20 hours and 15 minutes. The four ships beginning with the Werra are sometimes classified as a distinct Werra class'''.

These were the line's first steel ships, and with them, twice weekly service to New York could be offered. The still larger and faster  was ordered in early 1887 and entered service the following year. She was the last single-screw steamer to hold the speed record for the English Channel.

The speed of the new ships caused the United States postal service to choose NDL far more often than other carriers. It was the beginning of the contest for speed in the Atlantic. In addition, their greater size—the Elbe was half again as large as the type which had been the norm in the Atlantic trade, which had not much changed in twenty years— was accompanied by a change in layout which became the new norm. Until the Elbe, liners had almost universally had four decks, the two lowest devoted to cargo, the third to steerage passengers, and the top deck housing cabins; second-class accommodations were forward, first-class aft, each consisting of cabins to port and starboard of a small longitudinal saloon. On the Elbe there was a fifth deck on which a smoking room and ladies' drawing room were located, and the grand saloon was located athwart the ship from one side to the other, separated from the cabins. She resembled the Guion Line's SS Alaska, but was wider and thus more comfortable. This was also the beginning of the designing of ever more luxurious liner interiors designed to cause the passengers, at least in first and second class, to forget they were aboard ship. The Elbe was the first ship to have its interior designed by Johann Poppe, the most distinguished architect and designer in Bremen, who was to design the interiors of all NDL's liners for the next 25 years.

They entered service in 1890. Unlike their predecessors, they were built in Germany, by AG Vulcan of Stettin. However, like their predecessors and unlike the HAPAG liners, they were single-screw, and therefore did not meet the expectation of being faster.

The Werra, Fulda and Ems all served a new route between Genoa and Naples and New York which NDL had instituted in 1891.

The Eider went aground off the Isle of Wight on 31 January 1892, was salvaged in March but was then auctioned off to be broken up the following year.Bessell, p. 196. On 30 January 1895, the Elbe collided with the English collier Crathie in the Baltic and sank with the loss of 336 lives. Only twenty people in one lifeboat survived. In 1889 the Fulda rescued all 824 people aboard the Cunard liner SS Oregon. She was to have been sold to the Canadian Beaver Line owned by Elder Dempster but was damaged in dock in 1898 or 1899 and sold to be broken up.Kludas, p. 144  On 30 June 1900 the Saale burnt out in the fire at the NDL piers in Hoboken, New Jersey, with the loss of 109 people including the captain. She was sold to the Luckenbach Steamship Company of New York and rebuilt as a freighter, renamed J. L. Luckenbach, and ultimately broken up in 1924 as SS Madison.

The Ems was sold to the Beaver Line in 1900 or 1901 and renamed Lake Simcoe; she was broken up in Genoa in 1905.Kludas, p. 127. The Werra was chartered for a few years until 1899, sold to Italy in 1901 and broken up in 1903. On 15 June 1887, the Aller collided with a British fishing vessel, the Willie, which sank with the loss of six men; on 27 January 1898, she rescued the crew of the sinking British ship Dago. She was sold in 1902 and broken up in 1904. The Lahn was sold to the Russian Volunteer Fleet in 1904 and renamed Russ;Kludas, p. 147. she later returned to passenger service as the Dniester.

The Spree rescued the crew of the burning  in 1891. In 1892 and 1895 she broke her shaft and had to be towed into port. In 1897, she was converted to twin screws, lengthened, given a third funnel, and renamed Kaiserin Maria Theresia, attaining the target speed of 20 knots with ease. She replaced the rejected Kaiser Friedrich. In 1904 she was also sold to the Russians and renamed Ural; she was sunk the following year at the Battle of Tsushima.Gibbs, p. 182.

On 13 June 1889, the Trave collided with and sank the Russian schooner David; on 21 June 1892, she collided with and sank the American square-rigger Fred B. Taylor, causing two deaths.Edwin Drechsel, Norddeutscher Lloyd Bremen, 1857–1970: History, Fleet, Ship Mails, volume 1 Vancouver: Cordillera, 1994, p. 26. She became the last of the class in NDL service. After being laid up since 1903, she sailed between Bremerhaven and New York from March 1906 to November 1907, was sold in 1908 and broken up in 1909.

On 18 February 1892, the Havel collided with and sank the Italian barque Mascotta off Long Island while under mandatory pilotage. She continued on without aiding the survivors. She was sold to the Spanish Navy in 1898 and renamed Meteoro. She later returned to passenger service with the Compañía Transatlántica Española as the Alfonso XII'' and was broken up in 1927.

Ships

References

External links
 S/S Elbe at Norway Heritage
 S/S Werra at Norway Heritage
 S/S Fulda at Norway Heritage
 S/S Eider at Norway Heritage
 S/S Ems at Norway Heritage
 S/S Aller at Norway Heritage
 S/S Trave at Norway Heritage
 S/S Saale at Norway Heritage
 S/S Lahn at Norway Heritage
 S/S Spree at Norway Heritage
 Picture of S/S Kaiserin Maria Theresia at Norway Heritage
 S/S Havel at Norway Heritage

Ocean liners
Steamships of Germany
Ships of Norddeutscher Lloyd
 
Ocean liner classes